Marco Roberto Mosquera Borja (born December 3, 1984) is an Ecuadorian footballer who plays as a midfielder for 9 de Octubre.

Honors
Universidad Católica
Serie B: 2007

References

External links
FEF card 

1984 births
Living people
Sportspeople from Esmeraldas, Ecuador
Association football midfielders
Ecuadorian footballers
C.D. Universidad Católica del Ecuador footballers
Barcelona S.C. footballers
L.D.U. Loja footballers
L.D.U. Quito footballers
C.D. Olmedo footballers
C.D. El Nacional footballers
C.D. Cuenca footballers
S.D. Aucas footballers
Mushuc Runa S.C. footballers